Lynn Otto Matthews (born 1944) is an American former college football player who was recognized as an All-American.  Matthews later became a newspaper publishing executive.

Early years 

Matthews was born in Tampa, Florida.  He attended Chamberlain High School in Tampa, and he played high school football for the Chamberlain Chiefs.

All-American college football career 

Matthews accepted an athletic scholarship to attend the University of Florida in Gainesville, Florida, where he played defensive end for coach Ray Graves' Florida Gators football team from 1963 to 1965.  he initially played both ways, at tight end and defensive end, but played defense exclusively after his sophomore year.  He was a three-year letterman and was the defensive hero for the Gators in a 14–0 win over the Auburn Tigers in 1964.  He was selected as a second-team All-Southeastern Conference (SEC) selection in 1964 and 1965, and a first-team All-American in 1965.  He was known as a big-play maker and is regarded as one of the finest defensive ends for the Gators, and helped lead the Gators to their first New Year's Day bowl game, the 1966 Sugar Bowl.  Matthews graduated from the university with a bachelor's degree in 1966, and was later inducted into the University of Florida Athletic Hall of Fame as a "Gator Great."  In 1999, he was chosen as a second-team selection to the University of Florida's All-Century Team, and the Gators' All-Time Team in 1983.

Newspaper publisher 

At different times during his career, Matthews served as the publisher of the Ocala Star-Banner (Ocala, Florida), The Ledger (Lakeland, Florida), The Press Democrat (Santa Rosa, California) and the Sarasota Herald-Tribune (Sarasota, Florida).  In 1999, he was promoted to be the president and chief operating officer of the Times Regional Newspaper Group, then consisting of twenty-one Times newspapers located mostly in the southeastern United States, including the Herald-Tribune and The Ledger.  Matthews retired from the Times Regional Newspaper Group at the end of 2002, after nearly thirty years with the company.

See also 

 1965 College Football All-America Team
 Florida Gators
 Florida Gators football, 1960–69
 List of Florida Gators football All-Americans
 List of University of Florida alumni
 List of University of Florida Athletic Hall of Fame members

References

Bibliography 

Carlson, Norm, University of Florida Football Vault: The History of the Florida Gators, Whitman Publishing, LLC, Atlanta, Georgia (2007).  .
Golenbock, Peter, Go Gators!  An Oral History of Florida's Pursuit of Gridiron Glory, Legends Publishing, LLC, St. Petersburg, Florida (2002).  .
Hairston, Jack, Tales from the Gator Swamp: A Collection of the Greatest Gator Stories Ever Told, Sports Publishing, LLC, Champaign, Illinois (2002).  .
McCarthy, Kevin M.,  Fightin' Gators: A History of University of Florida Football, Arcadia Publishing, Mount Pleasant, South Carolina (2000).  .
McEwen, Tom, The Gators: A Story of Florida Football, The Strode Publishers, Huntsville, Alabama (1974).  .
Nash, Noel, ed., The Gainesville Sun Presents The Greatest Moments in Florida Gators Football, Sports Publishing, Inc., Champaign, Illinois (1998).  .

1944 births
Living people
All-American college football players
American football defensive ends
American newspaper executives
Florida Gators football players
George D. Chamberlain High School alumni
Players of American football from Tampa, Florida
American chief operating officers